"O (Oh!)" is a song written by Byron Gay and Arnold Johnson and performed by Ted Lewis and His Band. It reached No. 13 on the U.S. pop chart in 1920.

Other charting versions
Pee Wee Hunt and His Orchestra released a version of the song which reached No. 3 on the U.S. pop chart in 1953.

Other versions
All-Star Trio released a version of the song as a single in 1920, but it did not chart.
Billy Murray released a version of the song as a single in 1920, but it did not chart.
Sauter-Finegan Orchestra released a version of the song as the B-side to their 1953 single "The Moon is Blue".
Lawrence Welk and His Champagne Music released a version of the song as a single in 1953, but it did not chart.
Sy Oliver and His Orchestra released a version of the song as the B-side to their 1959 single "The Touch".
Bill Black's Combo released a version of the song on their 1964 album, Bill Black's Combo Goes Big Band.
Boots Randolph released a version of the song on his 1973 album, Sentimental Journey.

References

1919 songs
1919 singles
1953 singles
Billy Murray (singer) songs
Columbia Records singles
Capitol Records singles
Coral Records singles